Vitti Dandu was released on 21 November 2014. Directed by Ganesh Kadam and produced by Ajay Devgn and Leena Deore, the movie was the first Marathi film produced by Ajay Devgn FFilms. Dilip Prabhavalkar (Daaji) and Ashok Samarth (Baapu Patil) played lead roles. The film had a budget of ₹2.5 CR.

Plot
The story revolves primarily around Daaji (Dilip Prabhavalkar) and his grandson, Govind (Nishant Bhavsar). Daaji narrates the story as a flashback from the present day as a grandfather (Ravindra Mankani) to his grandson (Shubhankar Atre). The story takes place in 1947 in Mor-gaon, a laid-back hamlet, just six days before the Indian Independence Day. During that time communication was slow and the news took over a week to reach other villages.

The film was shot in different locations across western Maharashtra and was produced by Bollywood actor Ajay Devgan, with Leena Deore alongside Pravin Patil as co-producers.

Cast
 Dilip Prabhavalkar as Daaji
 Ashok Samarth as Bapu Patil
 Yatin Karyekar as Usman Chacha
 Nishant Bhavsar as Govind
 Mrunal Thakur as Sandhya
 Vikas Kadam as Vasant
 Utpal Sawant as Rajaram

Release
The film was released on 21 November 2014 on 260 screenings across the state of Maharashtra By Ajay Devgn FFilms.

Reception 
The film has an average critics' rating of 2.9 and an average user rating of 3.9. The movie received awards for Best Cinematography and Best Marathi Film.

Box office
The film collected a total of ₹9 CR (1.3 Million USD), with ₹12.5 million on its first day and ₹13 million on its second day.

Soundtrack

Santosh Mulekar composed the film's music, while Shrirang Godbole and Aashay Parab wrote the lyrics.

The single "Bheduni Hi Jau (Vande Mataram)" was released on Indian Independence Day. Singer Papon made his debut in Marathi Cinema with the song "Pahuni Ghe Re Saare".

References

External links 

 

2010s Marathi-language films